Shuiquliu railway station is a railway station of Lafa–Harbin Railway, Jilin–Shulan Railway and Taolaizhao–Shulan Railway. The station is located in the Shulan of Jilin, Jilin province, China.

See also
Lafa–Harbin Railway
Jilin–Shulan Railway
Taolaizhao–Shulan Railway

References

Railway stations in Jilin